Anton Fier (June 20, 1956 – September 14, 2022) was an American drummer, producer, composer, and bandleader.

Family
Fier, known as Tony, was born in Cleveland, Ohio, to Ruthe Marie Fier and Anton J. Fier Jr., a former Marine and electrician. His parents separated when he was young and he lived with his stepfather, a polka musician.

Early career
Fier worked in a record store, began drumming, and contributed to recordings by The Styrenes and Pere Ubu. The 1978 Pere Ubu EP titled Datapanik in the Year Zero was dedicated to Fier.

He moved to New York City and got a job at SoHo Music Gallery where he had the chance to talk with musicians.

Answering an ad in the Village Voice, he became a member of The Feelies in 1978, playing drums on their critically acclaimed debut album Crazy Rhythms.

Mid-career
He was in The Lodge (with John Greaves) and played in the first line-up of The Lounge Lizards, appearing on their debut album. Fier then founded The Golden Palominos, which initially featured Arto Lindsay, John Zorn, Bill Laswell and Fred Frith. In the mid 1980s, he was briefly a member of Richard Hell and the Voidoids. He was also a member of Swans, appearing on their 1991 album, White Light from the Mouth of Infinity.

Fier collaborated extensively with Bill Laswell, Arto Lindsay, and Rhys Chatham. He also toured and recorded with Hüsker Dü guitarist, vocalist and songwriter Bob Mould. and played with bassist Jack Bruce and Japanese guitarist Kenji Suzuki on the 1987 album Inazuma Super Session – "Absolute Live!!"

Fier played and recorded on the John Zorn-led album Locus Solus in 1983. They recorded a live album for Zorn's 50th birthday celebration: 50th Birthday Celebration Volume 3 of the 50th birthday series on Tzadik Records. In 1984, he played on Laurie Anderson's Mister Heartbreak. 

Fier also contributed to records from the Electric Eels, Yoko Ono, Mick Jagger, Material, Herbie Hancock, Gil Scott-Heron, Peter Blegvad, Matthew Sweet, Stina Nordenstam, Lloyd Cole, Los Lobos, David Cunningham, Joe Henry, Afrika Bambaataa, and Jeff Buckley. 

Fier also produced several albums, such as the 1988 album of Drivin' n Cryin' Whisper Tames the Lion, a 2009 album by guitar virtuoso Jim Campilongo titled Orange, and Lianne Smith's Two Sides of a River, on which Fier also played drums.

Death
Syd Straw, a member of the Golden Palominos, posted on Facebook on 11 October 2019 that Fier was no longer playing drums.

Fier died on September 14, 2022, at the age of 66, in Switzerland, of assisted suicide. According to Exit International director Philip Nitschke, Fier was not suffering from terminal illness, but "wanted to die on his own terms after feeling he had accomplished everything he could in life."

Partial discography 

 Dreamspeed (Avant, 1993)
 Every Silver Lining Has a Cloud (Island, 1995)
 Dreamspeed/Blindlight 1992–1994  (Tzadik 2003)

References

External links 

 
Anton Fier's playlist for webSYNradio

1956 births
2022 deaths
Albums_produced_by_Anton_Fier
American rock drummers
American male composers
20th-century American composers
Island Records artists
Tzadik Records artists
The Golden Palominos members
Pere Ubu members
Musicians from Cleveland
Richard Hell and the Voidoids members
20th-century American drummers
American male drummers
20th-century American male musicians
The Lounge Lizards members
Deaths by euthanasia